WVBB (97.7 MHz) is a commercial FM radio station licensed to Elliston-Lafayette, Virginia, and serving the Roanoke metropolitan area.  It is owned and operated by Mel Wheeler, Inc., with studios and offices on Electric Road in Roanoke.  WVBB and sister station WVBE-FM 100.1 Lynchburg simulcast an urban adult contemporary radio format.  In weekday AM drive time, the stations carry The Steve Harvey Morning Show.

WVBB has an effective radiated power (ERP) of 260 watts as a Class A station.  The transmitter is off Mountain Park Drive in Salem, Virginia, on Fort Lewis Mountain.

History

Station swap
Its original call sign was WRON-FM.  

All Access reported on September 20, 2007 that Todd P. Robinson, Inc.'s WKCJ would be swapped to Radio Greenbrier, Inc. for WRON-FM (now on 103.1).  The swap took place on August 1, 2008.  WKCJ applied to move its city of license south to Elliston-Lafayette, and put its tower on Fort Lewis Mountain, about 10 miles east of Roanoke.

The swap ensured that when Todd P. Robinson, Inc. moved the 97.7 frequency, WRON-FM 103.1 would continue to serve Greenbrier County, West Virginia.

Station sale
On Wednesday, July 13, 2011, Roanoke, Virginia based Mel Wheeler, Inc. agreed to purchase the station for $675,000.  A new application was filed to move the signal to Elliston-Lafayette, on Fort Lewis Mountain, broadcasting 260 watts, but from a height of 1542 feet.

On December 2, 2011, Mel Wheeler, Inc. took ownership and control of WKCJ and began simulcasting the Urban Adult Contemporary format also on WVBE-FM 100.1 in Lynchburg, Virginia.  On December 9, 2011, the call sign on 97.7 was changed to WVBB. The station has been an almost fulltime simulcast of WVBE since then.  It breaks off to serve as the Roanoke-area network affiliate for Virginia Cavaliers football and men's basketball.

References

External links
 The Vibe Online
 

VBB
Radio stations established in 1983
1983 establishments in Virginia
Urban adult contemporary radio stations in the United States